Jorge Olvera (born 12 April 1961) is a Mexican wrestler. He competed in the men's freestyle 57 kg at the 1988 Summer Olympics.

References

External links
 

1961 births
Living people
Mexican male sport wrestlers
Olympic wrestlers of Mexico
Wrestlers at the 1988 Summer Olympics
Place of birth missing (living people)
Pan American Games medalists in wrestling
Pan American Games bronze medalists for Mexico
Wrestlers at the 1979 Pan American Games
Medalists at the 1979 Pan American Games
Sambokas at the 1983 Pan American Games
Wrestlers at the 1983 Pan American Games
Medalists at the 1983 Pan American Games
20th-century Mexican people
21st-century Mexican people